Michèle Pujol, born in Madaoua, Niger (20 April 1951 – 2 August 1997), was a French intellectual, feminist, economist, scholar, and human rights activist who lived in British Columbia, Canada. She was an assistant professor at the University of Victoria Department of Women's Studies and held the chair at the University of Manitoba. She was a significant feminist economic scholar and an advocate of social justice.

Pujol wrote essays, histories, and socio-economic issues affecting women, as well as a bibliography in several volumes on women's contributions to economics.  She was known for teaching and writing, in particular critical studies of economics, and a book, Feminism and Anti-Feminism in Early Economic Thought. Her academic writing and teaching have been widely influential. In the 1980s and 1990s, Pujol was associated with lesbian-feminism, a movement from which she did not distance herself.

She was a committed scholar who would challenge accepted views about the past and the methodologies of economics.

Biography

Early life
Pujol was born in Africa, she was a daughter of a French colonial administrator in Niger and a home economist. She went to college in Paris, where she studied mathematics, and then went on to get a bachelor's degree in economics.

She arrived in Paris from French Polynesia just as the Paris riots were occurring. Her earliest thinking was formed in the collective action of students, workers and the sexual and intellectual liberation happening in France at that time.

She graduated from Haut Enseignement Commercial pour les jeunes filles in 1973.

Drawn to the radicalism of the west coast, she travelled to the United States to complete her master's degree, this time writing in English, at Washington State University.  Her doctorate in economics was conferred on her by Simon Fraser University in Vancouver, Canada. Pujol became a professor of Women's Studies, first at the University of Manitoba in 1981 and then associate professor at the University of Victoria, where she worked from 1990 until her death. Pujol was a popular teacher.

Academic life
Pujol's scholarship was imbued with a commitment to documenting the role of women in the economy and in economics. Her doctoral dissertation at Simon Fraser University formed the basis of her book, Feminism and Anti-Feminism in Early Economic Thought, which extended the scope of the history of economics in two directions. She investigated women's economic role in what she termed the "malestream" of British classical political economy and early neoclassical economics from Adam Smith to Edgeworth and Pigou, a topic which historians of economics tend to restrict to a discussion of John Stuart Mill (the only central figure in classical or early neoclassical economics to emerge honourably from such scrutiny).

Writing on "The feminist economic thought of Harriet Taylor (1807–58)" in 1995, Pujol established the "materialist analysis that distinguishes Taylor from Mill's idealist and male-centred position." As Pujol stated, "there cannot be any doubt that Taylor stands on her own as an original and insightful feminist thinker and as an economist and political theorist." Pujol also extended the canon of past economic thought, reviving (and rescuing from what E. P. Thompson called "the crushing condescension of posterity,") feminist analytical contributions on economic inequality by Harriet Hardy Taylor (later Harriet Taylor Mill), Barbara Leigh Smith Bodichon, Millicent Garrett Fawcett, Eleanor Rathbone, and William Smart.

In addition to pioneering the feminist history of economics, Pujol was active in contemporary feminist economics, with particular attention to broadening research methodology.  She was engaged in a study of the implementation of pay equity policies in Canada.  An associate editor of Feminist Economics, from its foundation, Pujol, together with Nancy Folbre, edited an "Explorations," section in the Fall 1996 issue on feminist issues in national accounting and on research priorities on nonmarket production. Pujol was a founding member of the International Association for Feminist Economics as well as an associate editor of the journal, Feminist Economics, to which she frequently contributed. She completed a book about pay equity in Canada for the University of Manitoba. Pujol also completed research on an important bibliography of 19th-century writings by women economists, published in English posthumously.

Atlantis: A Women's Studies Journal, published a special issue, "Sexual Economics," in 1999, on feminist economic perspectives, to celebrate the life and work of Pujol. The issue was edited by her colleague, Marjorie Griffin Cohen, at the Department of Women's Studies, Simon Fraser University, British Columbia, Canada.

Personal life
While teaching at Manitoba (1981–1988), she was active in the Winnipeg Gay and Lesbian Society, the Manitoba Action Committee on the Status of Women, and the Winnipeg Native Family Economic Development group. She was coordinator of Women's Studies at the University of Manitoba from 1984 to 1988. During her years in Winnipeg, Pujol was instrumental in organizing the first three Gay Pride Day marches and two Canadian Women's Music festivals. At the University of Victoria, she assisted women student activists with their work at the campus Women's Centre. Pujol was the first instructor to develop a (controversial) lesbian studies course. Her students and friends organized the first annual Lesbian Walk in response to homophobia experienced by Pujol and the Women's Studies Department at the University of Victoria.

Published works

Books

Book chapters

Journals and journal articles

Lectures

Pujol participated in the History of Economics Society annual meeting at the University of British Columbia in June 1996 with a presentation on her project for extending the canon, a multi-volume anthology of women's contributions to political economy before 1900, which she was editing for publication by Routledge and Thoemmes Press. This major work, of four or more volumes, promises to transform our knowledge of the history of women in economics.

A contributor to Out of the Margin: Feminist Perspectives on Economic Theory, Pujol presented this work at the 1996 International Association for Feminist Economics (IAFFE) conference in Washington, DC.

In 1995, Pujol presented "Is This Really Economics? Using Qualitative Research Methods in Feminist Economic Research," to the International Association for Feminist Economics (IAFFE) conference in Tours, France.

Death
Pujol was diagnosed with cancer in the spring of 1997, and had surgery in early April, during which liver metastasis was discovered. Pujol died on 2 August 1997, at home with her partner, Brook, five months after her diagnosis.

Sources
 Robert (1998). CWEN/RFÉ (Canadian Women Economists Network), downloaded 11 September 2011.
 St. Peter, Christine (1997). The Ring (University of Victoria), downloaded 11 September 2011.
 Verardi, Donna (1992). Personal notes and conversations with Dr. Michèle A. Pujol.  (Beguine Foundation, Canada).
 Feminist Economics, Volume 3, Issue 3 (1997).
 Pujol, Michele. "Feminism and Anti-Feminism in Early Economic Thought". Edward Elgar, Aldershot, England and Brookfield, Vermont, 1992.

References

External links
 http://econpapers.repec.org/article/cupjhisec/v_3a15_3ay_3a1993_3ai_3a02_3ap_3a333-334_5f00.htm

20th-century French philosophers
20th-century French economists
Lesbian feminists
French lesbian writers
French feminists
French political philosophers
Social philosophy
University of Victoria
1951 births
1997 deaths
French women philosophers
Feminist philosophers
Deaths from cancer in British Columbia
20th-century French women writers
20th-century French LGBT people